The 1940 Boston College Eagles represented Boston College as an independent during the 1940 college football season. The team was led by head coach Frank Leahy in his second year, and played their home games at Fenway Park in Boston and Alumni Field in Chestnut Hill, Massachusetts. They won all ten games in the regular season, were the highest-scoring team in the country, and won the Lambert Trophy, awarded to 'Eastern champion'. With its victory on New Year's Day in the Sugar Bowl over the undefeated Tennessee, champion of the Southeastern Conference (SEC), the BC Eagles were widely acclaimed as national champions. Minnesota and Stanford also have viable claims to the national championship.

From 1936 to 1964, the final AP Poll ranking college football teams was taken at the end of the regular season, before the postseason bowl games. The final 1940 rankings were published on December 2, and listed undefeated Minnesota (8–0) first with its thrilling home win by an extra point 7–6 over No. 3 Michigan (7–1). Stanford (10–0) was ranked second, Tennessee (10–0) fourth, and Boston College (10–0) was fifth.

Neither Minnesota nor Michigan played in a postseason bowl game, and Stanford defeated No. 7 Nebraska (8–2) in the Rose Bowl. Tennessee outscored its regular season opponents 319–26, soundly beating such opponents as Alabama, Florida, LSU, Kentucky, Virginia, and Duke. Despite where the AP rated teams at the end of the regular season, BC's post season win over Tennessee was widely deemed the best win of any team in the 1940 season.

Schedule

References

Boston College
Boston College Eagles football seasons
College football national champions
Lambert-Meadowlands Trophy seasons
Sugar Bowl champion seasons
College football undefeated seasons
Boston College Eagles football
1940s in Boston